Adrian Dodson also known as Adrian Carew (born 20 September 1970) is a British former Olympic boxer. He competed for Guyana at the 1988 Summer Olympics in Seoul under the name Adrian Carew before representing Great Britain at the 1992 Summer Olympics.

Amateur career

Dodson's first Olympic appearance came as a 17-year-old competing in the light welterweight division. He won his first two fights against Bilal el-Masri of Libya and Vukašin Dobrašinović of Yugoslavia before losing to eventual bronze medallist Reiner Gies of West Germany in the third round.

In 1989 he competed in the 147-pound division of Golden Gloves and won the Sugar Ray Robinson award as the outstanding boxer of the tournament.

After moving to England he was the ABA welterweight champion in 1990, fighting out of Lynn ABC. He then took his mother's last name Dodson and made his second Olympic appearance competing for Great Britain at the 1992 Games in Barcelona. Due to the presence of Robin Reid in the team Dodson was forced to drop from his favoured light middleweight to the welterweight division in order to compete. He won in the first round against Masashi Kawakami but lost in the second round to former World Amateur champion Francisc Vaştag of Romania.  Reid went on to win a bronze medal.

Professional career

After turning professional Dodson won his first 18 fights, including winning the WBO inter-continental title and defeating former world champion Lloyd Honeyghan in 1995. He lost to Winky Wright in a world title fight in 1997 but won the IBO super-middleweight title in 2001.

In 1999 he was fined £1,000 and banned for 18 months after being found guilty of biting Alain Bonnamie in the last round of their fight for the Commonwealth title.  Dodson retired from boxing in 2003 with a record of 25 wins and 6 defeats.

In 2011 Dodson was scheduled to make a comeback in the super-middleweight division as part of the Prizefighter series, where he could have faced fellow 1992 Olympian Robin Reid. Dodson pulled out before the series as he felt he was not in physical condition to compete and was replaced by Joe Ainscough.

|-

References

1970 births
Living people
Sportspeople from Georgetown, Guyana
Guyanese male boxers
Welterweight boxers
Boxers at the 1988 Summer Olympics
Olympic boxers of Guyana
Boxers at the 1992 Summer Olympics
Olympic boxers of Great Britain
Guyanese emigrants to England
Black British sportspeople
British male boxers